Joe Vasta is a former All-American lacrosse player at the United States Air Force Academy from 1983 to 1986 who is currently the tenth all-time Division I career scoring leader.

Career
In 2008, Duke's Matt Danowski surpassed Vasta as the all-time NCAA leading scorer. Along with Danowski,

Vasta is one of only six NCAA players to reach the 150-150 plateau (goals and assists).

In 1986, Vasta scored 108 points which ranks 12th all time on the single season scoring list.

During his four years at Air Force, the Falcons had an overall record of 43 wins and 13 losses, which included a 12 and 1 record in 1984 and also a victory over Georgetown in 1985.

Vasta was just the ninth Air Force representative in the prestigious, at that time, North/South college lacrosse all-star game. Vasta is 11th in career goals, 6th in career assists and 5th in career points-per-game, though the NCAA does not officially recognize that statistic.

Vasta played his high school lacrosse in Croton-on-Hudson, N.Y. and is presently a MD-11 Captain with Federal Express. He is also a member of the Flying Monkey Lacrosse club of Kansas City.

Vasta is currently an assistant coach at Rockhurst High School and was the head coach of the Blue Valley Titans girls' lacrosse team at Blue Valley High School from 2009 to 2012.

Statistics

Air Force Academy

(a) 10th in Division I career points
(b) 6th in career points-per-game

See also
Air Force Falcons men's lacrosse
Division I men's lacrosse records

External links
Air Force Lacrosse Records
Lacrosse Magazine Article 'Not Your Average Joe'
Flying Monkey lacrosse
Blue Valley Titans High School girls lacrosse team

American lacrosse players
Air Force Falcons men's lacrosse players
Living people
People from Croton-on-Hudson, New York
Year of birth missing (living people)